Stephen Harper is a British designer who works primarily in the automotive industry. He is responsible for a number of cars including the MG F, Ford Escort RS Cosworth, and the 2010 Volvo C70. Founding design education took place at the Royal College of Art in London from 1979 to 1980, following earning an apprenticeship to the Austin Motor Company (a part of British Leyland) in Longbridge, Birmingham in 1978.

In his early days at Austin Rover Stephen worked on the Austin Montego, Rover 800 as well as a large number of unreleased cars, working at the Canley Studios in Coventry.

Stephen then moved to Volvo BV in the Netherlands to help with the Volvo 480 and Volvo 440 before returning to the UK to work for MGA. It was here that Stephen was responsible for the design of various Rolls-Royce, Bentley, Ford and with Rover Special products, creating the initial design for the MGF as well as a number of other niche Rovers that weren't released.

During that time, he also designed the Rediffusion Concept 90 generation of flight training simulators, as well as being, in 1989, the first European automotive designer to work in China.

In 1993, he established his own design consultancy SHADO Ltd (SHADO is the acronym of "Steve Harper Art & Design Organisation") as a Design Consultancy, as managing director, creating mobility scooters, entertainment ride simulators, commercial vehicles and sports cars, along with the vehicles for the MARS2112 restaurant, in New York.
Stephen's 2nd secondment to Volvo (this time in Sweden) was in 2000, when he became influential in the creation of Volvo's post-millennial re-definition of the brand, being responsible for the design of a dozen production and concept cars for the company.

Returning to the UK in 2008, he was appointed a Senior Lecturer in Design at Coventry University and also established SHADO Design as a Design Consultancy, as managing director, this time in Paignton in Devon. There followed designs of a further influential flight training simulator for THALES, the ‘Reality Seven’, and works in Aerospace, Defence and Automotive fields.

In 2012 he joined SAIC in Shanghai and Tokyo developing the MG Icon concept car with the Chinese design team. While in China, following this, he helped establish the Geely Design Studio in Shanghai. 
Between 2014 and 2016, with a unique team of interns and post graduates, they created a pair of highly individual Electric Vehicle design and prototypes.

ThaiRung Union cars in Bangkok commissioned him to design a low volume 4x4 range of vehicles, the Transformer, and there also, developed a Diesel and EV Bus, to suit the Asian commuting requirements.

His passion for design has led to success in the creation of Design and Clay Modelling MasterClass Courses, which have seen students attending for all corners of the globe.

In 2017 his extensive experience and knowledge saw him appointed as an expert witness, establishing Stephen as a highly reputable expert on Trademark and Design focused proceedings.

For two years, from mid-2018 to 2020, his role was to be the Creative Lead at Proton Holdings in Kuala Lumpur, Malaysia, as it integrated into the Geely portfolio of brands.

Companies worked for

 Proton Holdings Malaysia (2018 – 2020)
 SHADO Ltd (2007-date)
 Volvo Cars Design Studio (2000–2008)
 Creative Automotive Design (1994–2000)
 SHADO Ltd (1993–2000)
 MGA Developments Ltd (1987–1993)
 SHADO (1986–1987)
 Volvo Cars BV (1985–1987)
 Austin-Rover Styling Studios (1978–1984)

Notable designs

References

Further reading
 ^ 'Movers & Shakers – Steve Harper – Grabbing you heart-strings', Andrew Noakes, Classic Cars, June 2009.
 ^ 'The Escort Cosworth Story: Project Feral ACE-14', Dan White/Jamie King, Fast Ford, August 2009.
 ^ 'Bright Sparks', Jane Simms, Director, June 2009.
 ^ 'Steve's imagination lets him soar into the air', Paul Greaves, Herald Express, 12 March 2009.
 ^ 'Design Guru's £5m bid to find new talent', David Smith, The Observer, 8 February 2009.
 ^ 'Cosmetic Brilliance', Mabuyane Kekana, SOWETAN Road Rave, 22 August 2007.
 ^ 'Volvo refreshes the S40 sedan and V50 wagon inside and out', Jim Robinson, Metroland Media Group, 9 August 2007.
 ^ '2008 Volvo S40 and V50 First Impressions', Nadine Filion, AUTO123.com, 9 July 2007.
 ^ 'Volvo grows younger', J.P Vettraino, AUTOWEEK, 26 June 2007.
 ^ 'The Nokia, Ikea of a Car', Wiwat Chang, Bangkok Post, 13 October 2006.
 ^ 'Think like a Swede', Glen Woodcock, AUTONET DRIVE, 9 October 2006.
 ^ 'Car design can be a national game', Tony Whitney, Vancouver Sun, 29 September 2006
 ^ '2007 Volvo S80', Bengt Halvorson, carconnections.com, 25 September 2006.
 ^ 'S60 with added BLIS', Alastair Clements, AUTOCAR, 22 June 2004.
 ^ 'Facelift plus for big Volvo's', Andrew Hamilton, The Irish Times, 16 June 2004.
 ^ 'Big upgrades for Volvo's', John Oxley, WHEELS24.co.za, 17 February 2005.
 ^ 'Our Steve's a real character', Edward Stephens, Birmingham Evening Mail, 27 August 2004.
 ^ 'Volvo S80', Martin Sharp, AutoExpress, 20 May 2003.
 ^ 'Volvo S60R and V70R', Eddie Alterman, Automobile, February 2003.
 ^ 'The Cosworth Fords', Jeremy Walton, Bluestream Books. .
 ^ 'Three-Wheelers', Chris Rees. Patrick Stephens Ltd.

External links 
 SHADO Design  Stephen Harper's design company.

Living people
British automobile designers
Place of birth missing (living people)
Year of birth missing (living people)